Adult Contemporary is a chart published by Billboard ranking the top-performing songs in the United States in the adult contemporary music (AC) market.  In 1982, 19 songs topped the chart, based on playlists submitted by radio stations.

In the year's first issue of Billboard the number one position was held by Neil Diamond with "Yesterday's Songs", which was in its third week in the top spot.  It remained atop the chart for four weeks in 1982 before being replaced by "The Sweetest Thing (I've Ever Known)" by Juice Newton, a re-recording of a song which had originally appeared on Newton's unsuccessful debut album in 1975.  Diamond returned to number one in October with "Heartlight", which also spent four weeks at number one, and his total of eight weeks in the top spot was the most by any artist in 1982.  Three songs tied for the longest unbroken run at number one during the year, each spending five weeks in the top spot.  In April and May, Greek composer and musician Vangelis spent five weeks at number one with "Chariots of Fire", the theme tune from the film of the same name, for which he had won the Academy Award for Best Original Score in March.  Later in the year, "Ebony and Ivory", a collaboration between Paul McCartney and Stevie Wonder, spent the same length of time at number one, and was immediately followed into the top spot by country singer Ronnie Milsap's recording of the 1962 song "Any Day Now", which achieved the same feat.

Four of 1982's AC number ones also topped Billboards all-genres chart, the Hot 100.  "Chariots of Fire" spent a single week atop the Hot 100 in May, and was immediately followed into the top spot by "Ebony and Ivory", which held the position for seven weeks.  In November, "Truly", the debut solo single from Lionel Richie, lead singer of the Commodores, topped both listings and quickly launched Richie to superstardom.  "Hard to Say I'm Sorry" by the band Chicago also reached the number one position on both charts.  Conversely, John Denver's "Shanghai Breezes", which spent one week atop the AC listing in May, could only climb as high as number 31 on the Hot 100.  The career of Denver, one of the biggest music stars of the 1970s, was in decline, and "Shanghai Breezes" would prove to be his final top 20 hit on the AC chart and his final top 40 hit on the Hot 100.  Following his chart-topping collaboration with Stevie Wonder, Paul McCartney took a second duet to number one when "The Girl is Mine", on which he performed with Michael Jackson, reached the top spot on the final chart of 1982.

Chart history

References

See also
1982 in music
List of artists who reached number one on the U.S. Adult Contemporary chart

1982
1982 record charts
1982 in American music